Kranti is a 2023 Indian Kannada-language action drama film written and directed by V. Harikrishna, produced by B. Suresha with Shylaja Nag, under Media House Studio. It stars Darshan and Rachita Ram in lead roles The music is also composed by V. Harikrishna. 

The film was released on 26 January 2023. The film opened to mixed to negative reviews from the critics.

Plot 
 
Kranti Rayanna, an NRI business magnate is called by his master Srikantaiah to attend 100th celebration of the government school; he studied in his childhood, where he returns home from Europe, but the school comes crashing down to ground during the function. Later, Kranti learns that Salatari, a shrewd businessman, wants to privatise 12,000 government schools by issuing government order with the help of corrupt Education minister Vaman Rao and Narasappa, a gangster, which actually led to many student's death and teachers losing their jobs. Due to these incidents, Kranti wages a revolution against Salatri, Vaman Rao Narasappa, where he thrashes Narasappa's son Nanjappa, and forcefully closes the private schools in order to seek attention from the Chief Minister, who later holds a meeting with Kranti. At the meeting, Kranti makes an eye-opening speech about the necessity for government schools to provide free education in order to remove the parents' burden. The Chief Minister is convinced and issues orders to renovate government schools and not to privatize them. Later, Vaman Rao resigns himself from his position, while Salatri is arrested.

Cast 
 Darshan as Kranti Rayanna
 Rachita Ram as Usha, Kranti's classmate and love interest 
 Ravichandran as Bhargava Rayanna, Kranti's father
 Sumalatha as Chief Minister
 Tarun Arora as Salatri 
 Sampath Raj as Education minister Vaman Rao 
 P. Ravi Shankar as Narasappa
 Achyuth Kumar as Sadashivayya, a school teacher
 B. Suresha as Srikantaiah, Kranti's school headmaster
 Sadhu Kokila as Kranti's Aide
 Girija Lokesh as Rukkamma, Kranti's school teacher
 Mukhyamantri Chandru as Basava Rayanna, Kranti's grandfather
 Umashree as Kranti's grandmother
 Samyukta Hornad as Jenny, Kranti's friend
 Dharmanna Kadur as Nagaraju, Kranti's friend
 Vainidhi Jagadish as Jyothi Rayanna, Kranti's Sister
 Dharma as Vishwanath, Kranti's friend
 Girish Shivanna as Gopi , Kranti's Friend
 Nayana Sharath as Meenakshi 
 Jahangir as Police officer
 P D Satishchandra as Constable Soorappa
 Ashwin Hassan as DC
 Keerthi Banu as IT Officer
 Ravikiran as Police Officer
 Mandya Ramesh as Salatri's Secretary
 Sunder Veena as Education Officer
 Sunetra Pandit as Education Officer
 Nimika Rathnakar as dancer in song "Pushpavati"

Production 
The film was tentatively known as #D55. On 10 September 2021, the film's official title was unveiled as Kranti. The film was then launched on 15 October 2021.

Music
The music of the film is composed by V. Harikrishna. The first single titled "Dharani" was released on 10 December 2022. The second single titled "Bombe Bombe" was released on 18 December 2022. The third single titled "Pushpavati" was released on 25 December 2022.

Release
The film was released on 26 January 2023 coinciding with Republic day of India.

Home media
The satellite rights of the film were sold to Udaya TV for 13 crores and streaming rights to Amazon Prime Video. The film was premiered on Amazon Prime Video from 23 February 2023.

Reception

Box-Office
Speculations were rife that the figure of ₹100 crore collection which was reported to have included the non-theatrical rights  was also fabricated.

References

External links 
 

2023 films
Indian action films